Atriplex spinifera is a species of saltbush, known by the common names spiny saltbush and spinescale saltbush.

It is endemic to California, where it grows in dry habitat with saline soils, such as salt flats. Its distribution includes the Mojave Desert, the southern Transverse Ranges, and the Central Valley, and surrounding mountain ranges. It is a halophyte.

Description
Atriplex spinifera is a grayish or whitish brambly shrub with erect branching stems growing to a maximum height near 2 meters. The tangled branches are stiff and tipped with spiny points. The leaves are oval in shape and less than 3 centimeters in length.

The shrub is dioecious, with male and female individuals. The male flowers are small clusters in the leaf axils. The female flowers are solitary or borne in small clusters, and are enclosed in scaly bracts which become spherical as the fruit grows within.

References

External links
Jepson Manual Treatment — Atriplex spinifera
USDA Plants Profile: Atriplex spinifera
Flora of North America
Atriplex spinifera — U.C. Photo gallery

spinifera
Endemic flora of California
Halophytes
Flora of the California desert regions
Natural history of the California Coast Ranges
Natural history of the Central Valley (California)
Natural history of the Mojave Desert
Natural history of the Santa Monica Mountains
Natural history of the Transverse Ranges
~
Plants described in 1918
Dioecious plants
Flora without expected TNC conservation status